Every year, each town and barangay or even sitio / purok celebrates its fiesta in honor their patron saints.
During this time, streets are often filled with colors, lights, and banners to signify the fiesta season. It's been a tradition for Boholanos around the world to return to their respective hometowns during fiesta for homecoming and family reunions.

List of Festivals

List of Fiesta Dates

References

Culture of Bohol
Cebuano culture
Visayan festivals
Bohol
Tourist attractions in Bohol